Athanasios Demirtzoglou (born 21 October 1974) is a retired Greek football midfielder.

References

1974 births
Living people
Greek footballers
Apollon Pontou FC players
Veria F.C. players
Panionios F.C. players
Ethnikos Asteras F.C. players
Paniliakos F.C. players
Olympiacos Volos F.C. players
Pierikos F.C. players
Anagennisi Epanomi F.C. players
Super League Greece players
Association football midfielders
Footballers from Thessaloniki